Elahi is an Aramaic word meaning "My God". Elah means "god", with the suffix -i meaning "my." Being Aramaic and not Hebrew (there is no singular possessive for "god" in Biblical Hebrew), in the Old Testament, Elahi is found only in the books of Ezra and Daniel. It is best known for its transliteration in Mark 15:34, "ἐλωΐ ἐλωΐ" eloi eloi.

Christian use 
Some scholars believe Elahi may be the name of God that Jesus vocalized in his last words on the cross. Science historian Livio Catullo Stecchini and Jan Sammer write, "The limits of Mark‘s knowledge of Hebrew are revealed by the sentence Elo[h]i Elo[h]i Lama Sabachthani which he puts into the mouth of Jesus. It is a confused rendering into Greek lettering of the text of Psalm 22:2, which reads in Hebrew eli eli lama azabtani and in Aramaic elahi elahi lema sebaqtani."

Arabic parallel 

In the Arabic language, Ilahi (Arabic: إلٰهي ʾīlāhī) is used to invoke Allah as "My God".

With the arrival of Islam in the subcontinent, the name migrated into South Asia adding to the etymological progression of the word. The Arabic language  provided the linguistic and cultural conduit for the transfer of the name. The Muslims of medieval South Asia adopted the name in small numbers. For example, the former deputy prime minister of Pakistan was Chaudhry Pervaiz Elahi.  The name is also found in neighboring Afghanistan or Iran.

See also 
 Aramaic of Jesus
 Elohim
 Semitic Languages

References

External links 
 Discovering the Language of Jesus
 The Last Words
 Why Does Mark have "Eloi" and Matthew have "Eli" for the same statement?

Names of God in Judaism
Aramaic words and phrases
Aramaic words and phrases in Jewish prayers and blessings